Giovanni Mantovani (born 5 February 1955) is a former Italian racing cyclist.

Major results

1977
1st Stage 3 Giro di Puglia
4th Tre Valli Varesine
8th Milano–Torino
1979
1st Stage 1 Tour of the Basque Country
4th G.P. Camaiore
6th Tre Valli Varesine
9th Milan–San Remo
1980
Giro d'Italia
1st Stages 9 & 10
1981
1st Giro del Veneto
2nd Coppa Bernocchi
2nd Giro di Campania
2nd G.P. Camaiore
3rd Overall Giro del Trentino
1st Stages 1 & 3a
3rd Overall Giro di Puglia
1982
1st Milano-Vignola
3rd Giro dell'Umbria
3rd GP Alghero
5th Milano–Torino
7th Overall Route du Sud
1st Stages 2b & 3
1983
1st Stage 2 Giro di Puglia
1st Giro dell'Etna
2nd GP Alghero
3rd Trofeo Pantalica
5th Milano–Torino
1984
1st  Overall Giro di Puglia
1st Stages 1 & 2
2nd Giro del Lazio
2nd Giro di Romagna
8th Giro dell'Emilia
1985
1st Stage 4 Giro di Puglia
1st Tre Valli Varesine
2nd Giro di Toscana
3rd Coppa Bernocchi
5th Milan–San Remo
1986
1st Stage 1 Giro di Puglia
1st Nice–Alassio
8th Trofeo Laigueglia
1988
3rd Rund um den Henninger Turm
4th Trofeo Laigueglia

References

External links 

1955 births
Living people
Italian male cyclists
Italian Giro d'Italia stage winners
Cyclists from the Metropolitan City of Milan